Brêmes is a commune in the Pas-de-Calais department in the Hauts-de-France region in northern France.

Geography
A village situated 10 miles (16 km) south of Calais, on the D213 road. Surrounded by water, including the lake of Brêmes.

Population

Sights
 The church of the St. Martin, dating from the late 19th century.
 The ruins of a watermill.

See also
Communes of the Pas-de-Calais department

References

External links

 Official website of the commune 

Communes of Pas-de-Calais